Boston Aztec is an American amateur soccer team based in Beverly, Massachusetts, United States. Founded in 2005, the team plays in Women's Premier Soccer League (WPSL), a national amateur league at the second tier of the American Soccer Pyramid.

In 2009, the Boston Aztec became the reserve team to the WPS Boston Breakers.  The Breakers team has loan agreements in place for players to compete with the Boston Aztec in WPSL matches.  The Boston Aztec players also train with the Boston Breakers staff.  The Boston Aztec roster is composed entirely of post-college players.  In 2010, the Boston Aztec enter a U23 team into the WPSL which is entirely made up of college players and is not connected to the Boston Breakers

Aztec's home is Endicott College, located in the city of Beverly, MA.  The team is operated by the Aztec Soccer Club, which also operates a National Premier Soccer League team called Boston Aztec.  The team's colors are red and white.  The U23 colors are red and black.

Players

2011 Boston Aztec Breakers reserve roster
As of 7 July 2011.

 (On loan from Boston Breakers)
 (On loan from Boston Breakers)
 (On loan from Boston Breakers)
 (On loan from Boston Breakers)
 (On loan from Boston Breakers)
 (On loan from Boston Breakers)
 (On loan from Boston Breakers)
 (On loan from Boston Breakers)

Notable former players
  Meotis Erikson (2007, 2009)
  Ashley Phillips (2009)

Year-by-year
{| class="wikitable"
!Year
!Division
!League
!Reg. season
!Playoffs
|-
|2005
|2
|WPSL
|7th, East
|
|-
|2006
|2
|WPSL
|7th, East North
|
|-
|2007
|2
|WPSL
|6th, East North
|Did not qualify
|-
|2008
|2
|WPSL
|3rd, East North 
|Did not qualify
|-
|2009
|2
|WPSL
|1st(tied), East 
|#2 seed in playoffs, upset by #3 Lancaster Inferno
|
|-
|2010
|2
|WPSL
|1st, East- Northeast Division
|#1 seed in East playoffs, defeated Long Island Fury in East Final, 2010 WPSL National Champions, defeating Ajax America in Dallas, TX
|
|-
|2011
|2
|WPSL
|3rd, East- Northeast Division
|'Breakers Reserves #3 seed in East playoffs, defeated ASA Chesapeake Charge in East Final, 2011 WPSL East Champions, lost to Chicago Red Starts in National Semi-Finals in Chicago, ILAztec U23 #1 seed in East playoffs, defeated by Breakers Reserves in East Semi-Finals
|}

Honors2010 WPSL Final Four MVP  Leah Blayney Boston Aztec Breakers Reserves2010 First Team ALL-WPSL  Leah Blayney Boston Aztec Breakers Reserves
  Anna Caniglia Boston Aztec Breakers Reserves2010 Second Team ALL-WPSL'''
  Jess Luscinski Boston Aztec U23
  Kelly Lawrence Boston Aztec Breakers Reserves
  Katherine Donnelly Boston Aztec U23

Competition history

Head coaches
  Dushawne Simpson (2005–2008)
  Meotis Erikson (2009)
  Rebekah Splaine (2009)
  Mike Kersker Breakers Reserves (2010–present)
  Dushawne Simpson Boston Aztec U23 (2010–present)

Other staff
  Javier Mejia-Blau Asst Coach Breakers Reserves (2010)
  Peter Kersker Asst Coach Breakers Reserves (2010)
  Mo Keita Asst Coach Boston Aztec U23 (2010)
  Ebbie Kodiat Asst Coach Boston Aztec U23 (2010)
  Ed Ryan Asst Coach Boston Aztec U23 (2010)
  Pete Levasseur Asst Coach Boston Aztec U23 (2010)
  Sarah Miller Strength Coach Boston Aztec U23 (2010)
  Barbara Hemphill Trainer (2008–present)
  Jack Lindsay Trainer (2010)

Administrative staff
  Brandon Nelson General Manager (2008–present)
  Eric Slack Director of Media Relations (2005–present)

Home stadiums
 Salem State College, (2005–2006)
 UMass Lowell, (2007)
 Amesbury Sports Park, (2008–2009)
 Endicott College, (2010)

References

External links
 Official Site
 WPSL Boston Aztec page

   

Women's Premier Soccer League teams
Women's soccer clubs in the United States
Aztec Soccer Club
Soccer clubs in Massachusetts
Soccer clubs in Boston
Association football clubs established in 2005
2005 establishments in Massachusetts